The 2018–19 FC Red Bull Salzburg season was the 86th season in club history. They were defending League champions.

Season review

July and August 
Red Bull Salzburg started the Bundesliga season on 29 July 2018 against LASK. Red Bull Salzburg won the match 3–1. Red Bull Salzburg got an own goal from Alexander Schlager and two goals from Mu'nas Dabbur. Maximilian Ullmann scored for LASK from the penalty spot. Matchday two took place on 4 August 2018 against SV Mattersburg. Red Bull Salzburg won the match 2–0 with goals from André Ramalho and Mu'nas Dabbur.

Red Bull Salzburg 2018–19 season started with a first round match in the Austrian Cup against ASKÖ Oedt. Red Bull Salzburg won 6–0 with two goals from Xaver Schlager, two goals from Reinhold Yabo, a goal from Smail Prevljak, and a goal from Mu'nas Dabbur.

Kits

Squad

Out on loan

Transfers

In

Out

 Haidara's move was announced on the above date, but was not official until 1 January 2019.
 Dabbur and Wolf's moves were announced on the above dates, but were not official until 1 July 2019.

Loans out

Released

Friendlies

Competitions

Bundesliga

League table

Regular stage

Results summary

Results by round

Results

Championship stage

Results summary

Results by round

Results

League table

Austrian Cup

UEFA Champions League

Qualifying rounds

UEFA Europa League

Group stage

Knockout phase

Statistics

Appearances and goals

|-
|colspan="14"|Players also registered for Liefering :
|-
|colspan="14"|Players away on loan :
|-
|colspan="14"|Players who left Red Bull Salzburg during the season:

|}

Goal scorers

Disciplinary Record

References

FC Red Bull Salzburg seasons
Red Bull Salzburg
Red Bull Salzburg
Red Bull Salzburg
Austrian football championship-winning seasons